Yeşilyenice is a quarter of the city Amasya, Amasya District, Amasya Province, Turkey. Its population is 866 (2021). Before the 2013 reorganisation, it was a town (belde).

References

Amasya